Posht-e Larijan (also Romanized as Posht-e Lārījān) is a village in Lavasan-e Kuchak Rural District, Lavasanat District, Shemiranat County, Tehran Province, Iran. At the 2006 census, its population was 19, in 7 families.

References 

Populated places in Shemiranat County